Beat Torture is the seventh album by West London Post punk and Indie band The Times released in 1988.<ref name="Discogs.com">[http://www.discogs.com/Times-Beat-Torture/release/1015370  The Times on Discogs.com]</ref>

Track listing
Side AGodevil - 04:40Heaven Sent Me An Angel - 04:14I'll Be Your Volunteer - 02:57Department Store - 03:27Love Like Haze Or Rain - 06:36
Side BIt Had To Happen - 04:09Chelsea Green - 03:48How To Start Your Own Country - 03:58On The Peace Line - 03:24Scarlet And Sapphire - 04:24
+ tracks on CDAngel - 04:13Volunteer - 03:36Country - 04:04Love'' - 05:48

References

The Times (band) albums
1988 albums